Voiculeț is a Romanian surname. Notable people with the surname include:

Adrian Voiculeț (born 1985), Romanian footballer
Claudiu Voiculeț (born 1985), Romanian footballer

Romanian-language surnames